Annalisa Minetti (born 27 December 1976 in Rho) is an Italian singer, politician and Paralympic athlete.

Minetti was a beauty pageant contestant in the 1997 edition of Miss Italia; she gained public attention because she was the first blind woman admitted to the competition. She placed in 7th position and won the title of Miss Gambissime (Miss Super Legs).

Sanremo Music Festival
At the age of 15, helped by her uncle, she took the first steps into the music scene, singing in piano bars covers of Prince, Ray Charles, Celine Dion and Aretha Franklin, her favorite artist. In 1998 she won the 48th edition of the Sanremo Music Festival with the song Senza te o con te.

Paralympic Games
As a para-sport athlete Minetti competes in the T11 disability classification category. She competed in the 2012 Summer Paralympics in the 1500 metres but due to there being no T11 race in the schedule, she entered the T12 event. She ended the race in third position but set a new world record for her class, beating the previous record set by Miroslava Sedlackova.

Personal history
In the Italian legislative elections of 2013 Annalisa Minetti was candidate with the political movement of Mario Monti.

References

External links
 
 
 
 

1976 births
Living people
Civic Choice politicians
21st-century Italian politicians
Sanremo Music Festival winners
Paralympic athletes of Italy
Paralympic bronze medalists for Italy
Visually impaired middle-distance runners
Athletes (track and field) at the 2012 Summer Paralympics
World record holders in Paralympic athletics
Medalists at the 2012 Summer Paralympics
Blind musicians
Italian blind people
21st-century Italian women politicians
Italian disabled sportspeople
21st-century Italian singers
21st-century Italian women singers
Paralympic athletes of Fiamme Azzurre
Paralympic athletes of Fiamme Oro
Paralympic medalists in athletics (track and field)
Italian female middle-distance runners